Alexander Pines (born June 22, 1945) is an American chemist. He is the Glenn T. Seaborg Professor Emeritus, University of California, Berkeley, Chancellor's Professor Emeritus and  Professor of the Graduate School, University of California, Berkeley, and a member of the California Institute for Quantitative Biosciences (QB3) and the Department of Bioengineering. He was born in 1945, grew up in Bulawayo in Southern Rhodesia (now Zimbabwe) and studied undergraduate mathematics and chemistry in Israel at Hebrew University of Jerusalem. Coming to the United States in 1968, Pines obtained his Ph.D. in chemical physics at M.I.T. in 1972 and joined the UC Berkeley faculty later that year.

Research 
Pines is a pioneer in the development and applications of nuclear magnetic resonance (NMR) spectroscopy of non-liquid samples. In his early work, he demonstrated time-reversal of dipole-dipole couplings in many-body spin systems, and introduced high sensitivity, cross polarization NMR of dilute spins such as carbon-13 in solids (Proton Enhanced Nuclear Induction Spectroscopy), thereby helping to launch the era of modern solid-state NMR in chemistry. He also developed the areas of multiple-quantum spectroscopy, adiabatic sech/tanh inversion pulses, zero-field NMR, double rotation and dynamic-angle spinning, iterative maps for pulse sequences and quantum control, and the quantum geometric phase. His combination of optical pumping and cross-polarization made it possible to observe enhanced NMR of surfaces and the selective "lighting up" of solution NMR and magnetic resonance imaging (MRI) by means of laser-polarized xenon.

Until he retired to emeritus status, his program was composed of two complementary components. The first is the establishment of new concepts and techniques in NMR and MRI, in order to extend their applicability and enhance their capability to investigate molecular structure, organization and function from materials to organisms. Examples of methodologies emanating from these efforts include: novel polarization and detection methods, ex-situ and mobile NMR and MRI, laser-polarized NMR and MRI, functionalized NMR biosensors and molecular imaging, ultralow and zero-field SQUID NMR and MRI, remote detection of NMR and MRI amplified by means of laser magnetometers, and miniaturization including fluid flow through porous materials and "microfluidic chemistry and NMR/MRI on a chip". The second component of his research program involves the application of such novel methods to problems in chemistry, materials science, and biomedicine.

Awards 
Among his many prestigious awards and honors, Pines has received the Langmuir Medal of the American Chemical Society, the Faraday Medal of the Royal Society of Chemistry, the Wolf Prize for Chemistry (together with Richard R. Ernst) in 1991. He was awarded the F.A. Cotton Medal for Excellence in Chemical Research of the American Chemical Society in 1999. In 2005, an Ampere Symposium was held in honor of Pines' 60th birthday in Chamonix, France, and in 2008, he was awarded the Russell Varian Prize at the European Magnetic Resonance Conference. (Previous Varian Prizes winners: Jean Jeener, Erwin Hahn, Nicolaas Bloembergen, John. S. Waugh, and Alfred G. Redfield.) Pines has also been recognized by numerous teaching honors, including the University of California's Distinguished Teaching Award. He is a member of the U.S. National Academy of Sciences, the American Academy of Arts and Sciences and a Foreign Member of the Royal Society (London); he is Doctor Honoris Causa at the Weizmann Institute of Science, Universite Paul Cezanne, University of Paris and the University of Rome, and past President of the International Society of Magnetic Resonance.

References

External links 
Biography
U.C. Berkeley College of Chemistry faculty page
Pines Group Webpage
Alex Pines webpage

1945 births
Living people
People from Tel Aviv
21st-century American chemists
Faraday Lecturers
Foreign Members of the Royal Society
Hebrew University of Jerusalem alumni
Israeli chemists
Israeli emigrants to the United States
Israeli Jews
Jewish American scientists
Jewish chemists
MIT Department of Physics alumni
Members of the United States National Academy of Sciences
Rhodesian Jews
UC Berkeley College of Chemistry faculty
White Rhodesian people
Wolf Prize in Chemistry laureates
Nuclear magnetic resonance
Fellows of the American Physical Society
21st-century American Jews